Rajendra Bhandari (born 1956) is an Indian Nepali-language poet and academic at the Sikkim Government College in Gangtok.

Biography
Born in brahmin family of Kalimpong, Darjeeling district, Bhandari has lived in Gangtok since the 1980s. He is the son of Bhagirat Bhandari a prominent writer and an astrologer. He received a doctorate in Nepali literature from the University of North Bengal.

Bhandari has won awards for his poetry, including the 1981 Diyalo Purashkar in Poetry from the Nepali Sahitya Sammelan in Darjeeling, the 1998 Shiva Kumar Rai Memorial Award from the South Sikkim Sahitya Sammelan and the 1999 Dr. Shova Kanti Thegim Memorial Award for poetry from the Shovakanti Memorial Trust in Gangtok.

Bibliography
Each year links to its corresponding "[year] in poetry" article:
 1979: Hiundey yee chisa raatka pardeharuma ("In the Veils of Cold Wintry Nights"), Gangtok, Sikkim: Padmakala Prakashan
 1986: Yee shabdaharu: yee harafharu ("These Words: These Lines"), Gangtok, Sikkim: Jana Paksha Prakashan
 1998: Kshar/Akshar ("Perishable/ Imperishable"), Gangtok, Sikkim: Jana Paksha Prakashan

References

External links
Poetry International brief biography of Bhandari
 Poetry International 2006 interview with Bhandari

1956 births
Living people
Indian poets
People from Kalimpong district
Nepali-language poets
Academic staff of Sikkim University
University of North Bengal alumni
Nepali-language poets from India
Writers from West Bengal